Dinak may refer to:

Dinak, Mazandaran
Dinak, Qazvin